General Scarlett may refer to:

James Yorke Scarlett (1799–1871), British Army general
Percy Scarlett (1885–1957), British Army major general
William Scarlett, 3rd Baron Abinger (1826–1892), British Army lieutenant general